Abdelmajid Bouyboud (born 24 October 1966) is a Moroccan former football defender, who played for Belenenses in Portugal.

He was included in the Moroccan squad in the 1994 FIFA World Cup.

References

External links

1966 births
Moroccan footballers
Moroccan expatriate footballers
Morocco international footballers
1992 African Cup of Nations players
1994 FIFA World Cup players
Botola players
Primeira Liga players
C.F. Os Belenenses players
Wydad AC players
Wuhan Guanggu players
Living people
Moroccan expatriate sportspeople in Portugal
Expatriate footballers in Portugal
Moroccan expatriate sportspeople in China
Expatriate footballers in China
Association football forwards